The lambda baryons (Λ) are a family of subatomic hadron particles containing one up quark, one down quark, and a third quark from a higher flavour generation, in a combination where the quantum wave function changes sign upon the flavour of any two quarks being swapped (thus slightly different from a neutral sigma baryon). They are thus baryons, with total isospin of 0, and have either neutral electric charge or the elementary charge +1.

Overview

The property that caused it to live so long was dubbed strangeness and led to the discovery of the strange quark. Furthermore, these discoveries led to a principle known as the conservation of strangeness, wherein lightweight particles do not decay as quickly if they exhibit strangeness (because non-weak methods of particle decay must preserve the strangeness of the decaying baryon).

In 1974 and 1975, an international team at the Fermilab that included scientists from Fermilab and seven European laboratories under the leadership of Eric Burhop carried out a search for a new particle, the existence of which Burhop had predicted in 1963. He had suggested that neutrino interactions could create short-lived (perhaps as low as 10−14 s) particles that could be detected with the use of nuclear emulsion. Experiment E247 at Fermilab successfully detected particles with a lifetime of the order of 10−13 s.

In 2011, the international team at JLab used high-resolution spectrometer measurements of the reaction H(e, e′K+)X at small Q2 (E-05-009) to extract the pole position in the complex-energy plane (primary signature of a resonance) for the Λ(1520) with mass = 1518.8 MeV and width = 17.2 MeV which seem to be smaller than their Breit–Wigner values. This was the first determination of the pole position for a hyperon.

The lambda baryon has also been observed in atomic nuclei called hypernuclei. These nuclei contain the same number of protons and neutrons as a known nucleus, but also contains one or in rare cases two lambda particles. In such a scenario, the lambda slides into the center of the nucleus (it is not a proton or a neutron, and thus is not affected by the Pauli exclusion principle), and it binds the nucleus more tightly together due to its interaction via the strong force. In a lithium isotope, it made the nucleus 19% smaller.

Types of lambda baryons

Lambda baryons are usually represented by the symbols    and  In this notation, the superscript character indicates whether the particle is electrically neutral (0) or carries a positive charge (+).

The symbols encountered in this list are:  (isospin),  (total angular momentum quantum number),  (parity),  (charge),  (strangeness),  (charmness),  (bottomness),  (topness), u (up quark), d (down quark), s (strange quark), c (charm quark), b (bottom quark), t (top quark), as well as other subatomic particles.

Antiparticles are not listed in the table; however, they simply would have all quarks changed to antiquarks, and  would be of opposite signs.  and  values in red have not been firmly established by experiments, but are predicted by the quark model and are consistent with the measurements. The top lambda  is listed for comparison, but is expected to never be observed, because top quarks decay before they have time to form hadrons.

‡  Particle unobserved, because the top-quark decays before it has sufficient time to bind into a hadron ("hadronizes").

The following table compares the nearly-identical Lambda and neutral Sigma baryons:

See also

 List of baryons

References

Further reading 
 

Baryons
Strange quark